Rob Cohen is an American vocal producer, record mixer, songwriter and record producer known for his work with artists including Portugal. The Man, Demi Lovato, Imagine Dragons, Dua Lipa, Cage the Elephant, Khalid, Charli XCX, Diplo, Young the Giant, Bishop Briggs, Wafia, and more.   After growing up in Denver Colorado, Cohen moved to Los Angeles to pursue a career in music production. He began working as an assistant engineer at Westlake Recording Studios; his projects included Rihanna's number-one album Unapologetic. After 5-years at Westlake, Cohen began to work with John Hill as a full-time engineer and vocal producer.

Awards

In 2020, Cohen won a Grammy Award for his work as a vocal producer and engineer on Cage the Elephant's album Social Cues, which won "Best Rock Album". In 2017, Cohen worked together with John Hill on Portugal. The Man's #1 Billboard single "Feel It Still" which also won a Grammy Award for "Best Pop Duo/Group Performance. He also received a Grammy Award nomination for engineering on Beyoncé album Beyoncé  album in 2015.

Discography

References

Year of birth missing (living people)
Living people
American audio engineers
American male songwriters
Grammy Award winners
Place of birth missing (living people)
People from Denver
Re-recording mixers
Record producers from Colorado